Marty Riessen and Sherwood Stewart were the defending champions, but Riessen did not participate this year.  Stewart partnered Ferdi Taygan, finishing runner-up.

Peter Fleming and John McEnroe won the title, defeating Stewart and Taygan 7–6, 6–4 in the final.

Seeds

  Peter Fleming /  John McEnroe (champions)
  Sherwood Stewart /  Ferdi Taygan (final)
  Fritz Buehning /  Kevin Curren (first round)
  Victor Amaya /  Steve Denton (semifinals)

Draw

Draw

References
Draw

U.S. Pro Indoor